GGB may refer to:

 Gerdau, a Brazilian steel company
 GGB Bearing Technology, a global plain bearings manufacturer
 Golden Gate Bridge, a suspension bridge in San Francisco, CA
 Gornergrat railway, in Switzerland
 Governor-General of the Bahamas
 Governor-General of Barbados
 Governor-General of Belize
 Green Garter Band, of the University of Oregon
 Grupo Gay da Bahia, a gay rights organization in Brazil